Jaime Chapman (born 17 March 2002) is an Australian rugby league footballer who plays as a er for the Brisbane Broncos in the NRL Women's Premiership and the Tweed Heads Seagulls in the QRL Women's Premiership.

Background
Born in Sutherland, New South Wales, Chapman played her junior rugby league for the Kurnell Stingrays. She is of Indigenous Australian descent.

Playing career
In 2019, Chapman joined the Cronulla-Sutherland Sharks Tarsha Gale Cup side.

On 20 September 2019, she joined the St George Illawarra Dragons NRL Women's Premiership squad as a development player.

2020
In 2020, Chapman began the season began playing for the Sharks' Tarsha Gale Cup side, before moving up to their NSWRL Women's Premiership squad.

On 24 September, Chapman moved into the Dragons' full-time NRLW squad.

2021
In 2021, Chapman joined the Tweed Heads Seagulls in the QRL Women's Premiership. On 20 February, she started at fullback for the Indigenous All Stars in their 24–0 loss to the Māori All Stars.

2022
On 12 February, Chapman played on the left wing for the Indigenous All Stars, scoring two tries in their 18–8 win over the Māori All Stars. She was awarded the Trish Hina Medal as player of the match.

Chapman played in six of seven matches for the St. George Illawarra Dragons in the postponed 2021 NRL Women's season, including the Grand Final on 10 April 2022. Chapman was named in the peer-selected NRL Dream team for the postponed 2021 season.

In early June, the Brisbane Broncos announced that Chapman had signed to play for the club in the 2022 NRL Women's season.

In late September, Chapman was named in the Dream Team announced by the Rugby League Players Association. The team was selected by the players, who each cast one vote for each position.

References

External links
St George Illawarra Dragons profile

2002 births
Living people
Indigenous Australian rugby league players
Australian female rugby league players
St. George Illawarra Dragons (NRLW) players
Rugby league players from Sydney
Rugby league wingers